Alia Bhatt (born 15 March 1993) is a British actress of Indian descent who predominantly works in Hindi films. She has received several accolades including four Filmfare Awards. One of India's highest-paid actresses, she has appeared in Forbes India Celebrity 100 list since 2014 and was awarded the TIME100 Impact Award in 2022.

Born into the Bhatt family, she is the daughter of filmmaker Mahesh Bhatt and actress Soni Razdan. After making her acting debut as a child in the 1999 thriller Sangharsh, she played her first leading role in Karan Johar's teen film Student of the Year (2012). She won the Filmfare Critics Award for Best Actress for playing a kidnapping victim in the road drama Highway (2014), and went on to establish herself with starring roles in several romantic films produced by Johar's studio Dharma Productions as well as the coming-of-age drama Dear Zindagi (2016).

Bhatt won three Filmfare Awards for Best Actress for playing a victim of drug abuse in the crime drama Udta Punjab (2016), an undercover spy in the thriller Raazi (2018), and a possessive girlfriend in the musical drama Gully Boy (2019). Following two poorly received films, she gained praise for playing the titular role in the biopic Gangubai Kathiawadi, had a brief role in the period film RRR, and starred in the fantasy film Brahmāstra: Part One – Shiva, all of which rank among the top-grossing Indian films of 2022.

In addition to acting, Bhatt has launched her own sustainable clothing brand and an ecological initiative. She supports various charities, and is an investor and prominent brand endorser. She has sung seven of her film songs, including the single "Samjhawan Unplugged" in 2014. Bhatt is married to the actor Ranbir Kapoor, with whom she has a daughter.

Early life and background
Alia Bhatt was born on 15 March 1993 into the Bhatt family to Indian film director Mahesh Bhatt and actress Soni Razdan. Her father is of Gujarati descent and her mother is of Kashmiri Pandit and British German ancestry. She holds British citizenship. She has an elder sister, Shaheen, and two half-siblings, Pooja and Rahul Bhatt. Actor Emraan Hashmi and director Mohit Suri are her paternal cousins, while producer Mukesh Bhatt is her uncle. She was educated at the Jamnabai Narsee School but dropped out of her twelfth grade to pursue acting.

Describing her childhood, Bhatt has said, "I had a rather grounded and modest upbringing. I didn't get the pleasures that people assume I would've got because I am Mahesh Bhatt's daughter." Growing up, she did not share a close bond with her father; Razdan has said that she raised her children mostly as a single parent as her husband did not take much interest in their lives. Bhatt has said that as a child, she "didn't miss him as such because I did not really have him", adding that they developed a closer bond only when she became an actress.

Bhatt aspired to act from a young age, and has said that she first realised it while rehearsing for the school choir in kindergarten. She soon began dance lessons at Shiamak Davar's institute. Her first acting role was at age five in her father's production venture Sangharsh (1999), in which she briefly played the younger version of Preity Zinta's character. Talking about her experience, she later remarked, "I don't remember much of the shoot. I would go to the sets only for the food". At age nine, she auditioned for a role in Sanjay Leela Bhansali's film Black (2005), but did not get the part. Three years later, Bhansali cast a then-12-year old Bhatt opposite a then-20-year old Ranbir Kapoor to make their debuts in his film Balika Vadhu, but the film was shelved.

Career

Early work (2012–2015) 

Bhatt had her first leading role in 2012 with Karan Johar's teen film Student of the Year, alongside newcomers Sidharth Malhotra and Varun Dhawan. She auditioned alongside 500 girls and was cast after losing . She played a sophisticated teenage girl involved in a love triangle. Anupama Chopra of Hindustan Times mentioned similarities between her character and Kareena Kapoor's role in Johar's Kabhi Khushi Kabhie Gham... (2001), but noted that her performance was "without the killer attitude". Lisa Tsering of The Hollywood Reporter dismissed her as "a washout. Not only is she inelegant in the dance numbers, but her expressions are limited; and the digital retouching of her face throughout the film is a distraction". The film grossed  at the box office, becoming a commercial success.

Dismayed by the critical response to Student of the Year, Bhatt was keen to play a better role. She found it in Imtiaz Ali's road film Highway (2014), in which she starred as a lonely teenage girl who develops Stockholm syndrome after being abducted. She took diction lessons to improve her Hindi, and was challenged by the emotional and physical requirements of the part. Ali shot the film sequentially and several scenes were improvised on set based on Bhatt's reactions. She has said that several aspects of her character's journey mirrored her own, as it was the first time she experienced situations that were different from her own privileged upbringing. Ronnie Scheib of Variety took note of her "endearingly cockeyed perf" and commended her for "bringing an underlying sadness and wistful intelligence" to her part. The film underperformed at the box office, though Bhatt won the Filmfare Critics Award for Best Actress and also gained a Best Actress nomination at the ceremony. She next appeared in Vikas Bahl's short film on women's safety, entitled Going Home.

Continuing her collaboration with Johar's company, Dharma Productions, Bhatt starred in the romantic films 2 States and Humpty Sharma Ki Dulhania (both 2014). The former was an adaptation of Chetan Bhagat's novel of the same name, and is about two management students who have trouble convincing their parents of their relationship. For her role as a headstrong Tamil girl, she learnt to speak her lines in Tamil with help from a tutor. Shubhra Gupta of The Indian Express was appreciative of Bhatt, labelling her a "surprise" and "easy and fresh and natural". She played the titular Punjabi girl who has an affair before her wedding with a flirtatious Punjabi boy, Rakesh, in Humpty Sharma Ki Dulhania, directed by Shashank Khaitan, which was described as a tribute to Dilwale Dulhania Le Jayenge (1995) by Johar. Writing for India Today, Rohit Khilnani thought that Bhatt had pitched in "one of her best performances so far", though Nandini Ramnath of Mint found her lacking in subtlety, writing that she was "more comfortable acting out her feelings through dialogue and actions". Both films were commercially successful, each earning over  worldwide. Her accomplishments in 2014 established her career.

Bhatt reunited with Bahl for the romantic comedy Shaandaar. Released in 2015, the film features Shahid Kapoor and Bhatt as insomniacs who fall in love during a destination wedding. Kunal Guha of Mumbai Mirror criticised the film and wrote that Bhatt "socks life into her character but fails to pump any into this film". The film did not perform well commercially.

Career progression (2016–2021) 

Bhatt began 2016 with a supporting role in Shakun Batra's ensemble drama Kapoor & Sons, starring alongside Malhotra and Fawad Khan, which was a critical and commercial success. She next took on the part of a poor Bihari migrant in Udta Punjab (2016), a crime drama about substance abuse from writer-director Abhishek Chaubey. The intense role marked a departure from the mostly light-hearted parts she had played before, and in preparation, she watched documentaries on drug abuse and learned to speak a Bihari dialect. The film generated controversy when the Central Board of Film Certification deemed that it represented Punjab in a negative light and demanded extensive censorship before its release. The Bombay High Court later cleared the film for exhibition with one scene cut. Bhatt's performance was critically acclaimed. Raja Sen of Rediff.com wrote that she "commits to her accent and deals with the film's most unsavoury section, and is stunning during an incendiary speech that elevates the entire film to a whole other level." She next played a troubled young woman who consults with a therapist (played by Shah Rukh Khan) in Gauri Shinde's coming-of-age film Dear Zindagi (2016). Writing for IndieWire, Anisha Jhaveri commended her for providing millennial angst with "a three-dimensionality". Udta Punjab and Dear Zindagi gained Bhatt awards attention; for the former, she won the Screen Award and the Filmfare Award for Best Actress, and for the latter, she received an additional Best Actress nomination at Filmfare.

The series of successful films continued with her next projectthe romantic comedy Badrinath Ki Dulhania (2017)which reunited her with Khaitan and Dhawan. It tells the story of an independent young woman (Bhatt) who refuses to conform to patriarchal expectations from her chauvinistic fiancée (Dhawan). Rachel Saltz of The New York Times took note of the film's statement on gender equality and wrote, "Without ever falling into the clichés of spunky Bollywood heroine, [Bhatt] effortlessly embodies that admirable thing: a modern woman." She received another Filmfare nomination for Best Actress. Meghna Gulzar's espionage thriller Raazi (2018) starred Bhatt as Sehmat Khan, a Kashmiri spy married to a Pakistani army officer. Set during the Indo-Pakistani War of 1971, the film is an adaptation of Harinder Sikka's novel Calling Sehmat. Anna M. M. Vetticad of Firstpost found Bhatt to be "stupendous" in the role, adding that "the young star once again displaying the maturity and confidence of a veteran on camera". Raazi proved to be one of the highest-grossing female-led Hindi films, and its success led Box Office India to credit Bhatt as the most successful contemporary actress of Hindi cinema. She won another Best Actress award at Filmfare.

Bhatt launched her own production company named Eternal Sunshine Productions in early 2019. Her first appearance that year was opposite Ranveer Singh in Zoya Akhtar's Gully Boy, a musical inspired by the life of the street rappers Divine and Naezy. She attended acting workshops to learn a ghetto dialect to enable her to improvise on set. The film premiered at the 69th Berlin International Film Festival. Writing for Screen International, Lee Marshall opined that "it's Bhatt's sharp performance that carries most successfully the mix of wry humour, romance and social comment that Gully Boy essays". Gully Boy won a record 13 Filmfare Awards, and Bhatt was awarded with her career's third Best Actress trophy.

The ensemble period drama Kalank (2019) marked Bhatt's biggest-budget film to that point. Set in the 1940s prior to the partition of India, it featured Dhawan and her as star-crossed lovers. She watched the films Mughal-e-Azam (1960) and Umrao Jaan (1981) to learn the body language of women from the era; to better her Urdu-speaking skills, she watched the Pakistani television series Zindagi Gulzar Hai. Shubhra Gupta bemoaned that she was "watchable, if increasingly, exasperatingly familiar". The film did not perform well at the box office. Bhatt next starred in Sadak 2 (2020), a sequel to her father's crime film Sadak (1991), which due to the COVID-19 pandemic in India could not be released theatrically and instead streamed on Disney+ Hotstar. The death of Sushant Singh Rajput sparked a debate on nepotism in the Hindi film industry; his fans blamed Bhatt for being one of the beneficiaries of nepotism and for once speaking dismissively of Rajput on Johar's chat show Koffee with Karan. This led to vote brigading on the film's trailer on YouTube, on which it became the second most-disliked video. The film received negative reviews, and Pallabi Dey Purkayastha of The Times of India dismissed Bhatt's performance "by her own high standards" to be "strictly average".

Established actress (2022–present) 

The year 2022 was key for Bhatt. She portrayed the titular prostitute in Sanjay Leela Bhansali's biopic Gangubai Kathiawadi (2022), which premiered at the 72nd Berlin International Film Festival. In preparation, she studied the work of actress Meena Kumari, and watched films about prostitution such as Mandi (1983) and Memoirs of a Geisha (2005). Commenting on media speculation that she had been miscast in such an assertive part, Saibal Chatterjee of NDTV opined that "the actress puts all doubts to rest with a marvellously lively performance". Additionally, Stutee Ghosh of The Quint commended her for playing the part with a "rare mix of innocence and jaw clenching seething anger". It emerged as her third release to gross over  worldwide. The Guardian featured her portrayal in their listing of the best big-screen performances of all time.

In the same year, she took on a brief role in the Telugu-language period film RRR, starring N. T. Rama Rao Jr. and Ram Charan. Even though she learnt to speak her lines in the language, a dubbing artist eventually voiced her lines. It emerged as the third highest-grossing Indian film of all time. She next starred as a victim of domestic abuse in the Netflix black comedy film Darlings, which marked her first production venture under her company Eternal Sunshine Productions. Namrata Joshi found her to be "perfectly at home in the role of an ordinary Mumbai chawl girl". The film became the most watched Indian film globally in its opening weekend on Netflix. In her final release of 2022, Bhatt starred opposite Ranbir Kapoor in Ayan Mukerji's fantasy film Brahmāstra: Part One – Shiva. The first part in a planned trilogy, the film took five years to film. Simon Abrams of the TheWrap bemoaned that Bhatt had been underused in a poorly written part, and disliked her chemistry with Kapoor. It earned  to rank as the highest-grossing Hindi film of 2022.

Bhatt will next reunite with Johar in his directorial, the romantic comedy Rocky Aur Rani Ki Prem Kahani, co-starring Ranveer Singh. Filming and release was delayed by a few months due to her pregnancy. She will also appear alongside Gal Gadot and Jamie Dornan in the Netflix spy film Heart of Stone, which will mark her first Hollywood film release.

Other work 
Bhatt has performed playback singing for the song "Sooha Saaha" in Highway (2014). A. R. Rahman, the composer of the film, invited her to his music school to undergo training. In 2014, she sang the unplugged version of the song "Samjhawan", for the composers Sharib-Toshi, in Humpty Sharma Ki Dulhania. In 2016, she sang an alternate version of the song "Ikk Kudi", for the soundtrack of Udta Punjab, with her co-star Dosanjh.

Bhatt has performed on stage at the Filmfare, Screen and Stardust award ceremonies, and has also participated in a stage show in Hong Kong alongside Varun Dhawan and Sidharth Malhotra. In 2013, she performed at a charity event with Dhawan, Malhotra, Aditya Roy Kapur, Shraddha Kapoor and Huma Qureshi to raise funds for the flood-affected victims of Uttarakhand. In August 2016, she performed in various cities of America for the "Dream Team 2016" tour, alongside Johar, the actors Dhawan, Malhotra, Roy Kapur, Katrina Kaif, Parineeti Chopra, and the singer Badshah.

Bhatt supports various causes and charitable organisations. She took part in a campaign for PETA in 2013 to raise awareness on homeless animals. She joined a charity fundraiser in 2015 organised by Cuddles Foundation for cancer-stricken children, and in 2017, she walked the ramp to support the cause. Also in 2017, she launched an ecological initiative named CoExist to raise awareness about the welfare of street animals. The initiative launched a denim donation drive that year, to make dog collars from discarded denims. The following year, Bhatt collaborated with Facebook for a campaign named Find Your Green, to campaign for environmentalism. In 2018, she launched an initiative named Mi Wardrobe is Su Wardrobe, through which she auctioned of clothes from her personal wardrobe to provide electricity to a village in Karnataka. Bhatt collaborated with the Indian arm of the NGO ActionAid in 2021 to provide essentials to underprivileged communities affected by the COVID-19 pandemic. In 2022, she became the first actress from India to partner with the Mandarin Oriental Hotel Group for their "I'm a Fan" campaign, through which she raised funds for the Salaam Bombay Foundation, which helps underprivileged adolescents.

Bhatt designed her own clothing line for women in 2014 for the online fashion portal Jabong.com and in 2018, she launched her own line of handbags for VIP Industries. She is also an investor in the beauty company Nykaa and in India's first biomaterial startup Phool.co. In 2022, she launched her own sustainable maternity and children's clothing brand, named Ed-a-Mamma.

Personal life 

Bhatt has frequently combated negative attention, including online trolling, for being a beneficiary of nepotism within the Hindi film industry. When asked about how she deals with it, she has said, "Of course, I felt bad. But feeling bad is a small price to pay for the work that you are respected and loved for." During an appearance on the talk show Koffee with Karan in 2014, Bhatt incorrectly named Prithviraj Chauhan as the President of India. This led to widespread trolling of Bhatt's IQ, which journalist Malavika Sangghvi described as an extension of the dumb blonde stereotype. Bhatt countered this by acting in a satirical YouTube video for All India Bakchod, named Alia Bhatt - Genius of the Year. Sangghvi noted that by making fun of herself, Bhatt had "managed to counter all her critics and, in fact, endear herself to them".

Early in her career, Bhatt was reluctant to discuss her personal life, stating that she would never publicly talk about her relationships. Despite media speculation, she did not speak about dating actor Sidharth Malhotra, but spoke fondly about their bond in 2019, after they had broken up. In 2018, Ranbir Kapoor, her co-star in Brahmāstra, revealed that he and Bhatt were dating. They married on 14 April 2022 in a traditional Hindu ceremony at their apartment in Mumbai. In November that year, she gave birth to their daughter Raha. As of 2022, Bhatt lives primarily in Mumbai, and also has a home in London.

Media image
The writer Sucharita Tyagi describes Bhatt's personality as "funny, endearing, silly and unapologetic". The journalist Raja Sen, in 2022, described Bhatt as "petite compared to her contemporaries" and wrote that "she embraces her girlishness and diminutive size because she likes astonishing those who may write her off as too young to play a certain character, or too small to take over a screen". Suhani Singh of India Today has said that despite her petite frame, she "can appear larger than life on screen". 

Laura Zornosa of Time magazine believes that Bhatt specialises in playing "fiercely tenacious lead roles", while Liz Kang of CNN has identified a theme of "dynamic, unconventional female characters in troubling circumstances". Ranjita Ganesan of Rediff.com opined that she is "known for her moving portrayals of breakdowns". Bhatt relies on instinct and spontaneity in her performances. Her directors, Meghna Gulzar and Shakun Batra believe that she prepares extensively for a part, but according to Gulzar, she internalises her character and ultimately "act[s] from her gut". Bhatt has said that she does not deconstruct her craft, believing that "I'd become a machine rather than a human being". Analysing Bhatt's career trend, Ganesan believed that unlike her contemporaries, she quickly emerged as a bankable star. Trade journalist Joginder Tuteja calculated that by 2022, she had a "track record of 13 hits out of 15 releases". In 2023, journalist Rajeev Masand named her one of Hindi cinema's best actresses of all time.

Forbes Asia has featured Bhatt in their 30 Under 30 list of 2017 and in their 100 Digital Stars list of 2020. She has appeared in Forbes India Celebrity 100 list since 2014, peaking at the eighth position in 2019. That year, the magazine estimated her annual income to be  and listed her as the highest-paid actress in the country. In 2018 and 2019, the Indian edition of GQ featured her among the nation's 50 most influential young people and credited her for "striking a balance between big-budget, all-star blowouts and more script-oriented films". Bhatt was listed in first place in The Times of Indias "50 Most Desirable Women" list of 2018, and she was named the "Sexiest Asian Woman" by the UK magazine Eastern Eye in 2019. Also in 2018, the market research firm YouGov named her India's ninth most influential celebrity. The magazine Femina has featured her in listings of women achievers in 2019 and 2021. In 2022, she was ranked in the 97th position in The Indian Expresss listing of the most powerful Indians. In the same year, Time magazine awarded her with the TIME100 Impact Award.

Bhatt is the celebrity endorser for a number of brands and products, including Coca-Cola, Garnier and Maybelline. Duff & Phelps estimated her brand value to be US$36.5 million, in 2019, the eighth-highest of Indian celebrities. She occupied the seventh and sixth positions in the next two years, respectively, and in 2022, she peaked in the fourth position, with a brand value of US$68.1 million.

Works and awards 

For her role in Highway (2014), Bhatt won the Filmfare Critics Award for Best Actress. She also received the Filmfare Award for Best Actress for her roles in Udta Punjab (2016), Raazi (2018) and Gully Boy (2019).

References

External links 

 
 
 

1993 births
Living people
Alia
British film actresses
British female models
British playback singers
British Hindus
British people of Indian descent
British actresses of Indian descent
British people of Gujarati descent
British people of Kashmiri descent
British people of German descent
Gujarati people
Kashmiri people
Actresses in Hindi cinema
Actresses in Telugu cinema
British expatriate actresses in India
European actresses in India
Actresses of European descent in Indian films
Filmfare Awards winners
Bollywood playback singers
Screen Awards winners
Zee Cine Awards winners
International Indian Film Academy Awards winners
21st-century British actresses